Lindfield may refer to:

Lindfield, New South Wales, Australia
Lindfield, West Sussex, United Kingdom
 Lindfield Rugby Club in NSW, Australia 
 Bob Lindfield (1901–1959), Australian rugby player 
 Craig Lindfield (born 1988), English footballer

See also
 Linfield (disambiguation)
 Lingfield (disambiguation)